The 1995 Bristol City Council election took place on 4 May 1995 with all seats being up for election, in preparation for Bristol City Council becoming a Unitary Authority following the abolition of Avon County Council. The same ward boundaries were used, however these are elections to a new authority and cannot be considered gains or losses compared to previously held seats.

The election saw national issues, such as the unpopularity of the national Conservative government and the state of the economy, being the major issues in the election. The Conservative candidates branded themselves as 'Bristol Conservatives', which was seen as an attempt to distance themselves from the national government. The Labour Party was expected to win a large majority but they were criticised by the Conservatives for cutting money from the Scouts while giving money to a lesbian/bisexual women's group.

Labour easily gained a majority and as predicted before the election the Liberal Democrats became the second largest party on the council driving the Conservatives down to third as compared to the previous district council.

Election results

The vote and seat share for all parties that contested the election:

Ward results

These election results are to the new Unitary Authority of Bristol City Council, therefore they cannot be considered gains or losses compared to previously held seats. Sebastian Matthews, who apparently stood as the "Macromedia Student" party, is possibly a nomination-paper error where 'Occupation' and 'Party' were swapped, c.f. Systems Designer.

Ashley

Avonmouth

Bedminster

Bishopston

Bishopsworth

Brislington East

Brislington West

Cabot

Clifton

Cotham

Easton

Eastville

Filwood

Frome Vale

Hartcliffe

Henbury

Hengrove

Henleaze

Hillfields

Horfield

Kingsweston

Knowle

Lawrence Hill

Lockleaze

Redland

Southmead

Southville

St George East

St George West

Stockwood

Stoke Bishop

Westbury-on-Trym

Whitchurch Park

Windmill Hill

References

1995 English local elections
1995
1990s in Bristol